Chewstick or chew stick may refer to:

 Chew stick, a stick used for cleaning teeth
 Chewstick, a common name for several species of plants in the genus Gouania, including:
 Chewstick, Gouania lupuloides, a Caribbean plant used for oral hygiene
 Smoothfruit chewstick, Gouania meyenii, of Hawaii
 O'ahu chewstick, Gouania vitifolia, of Hawaii
 Hairyfruit chewstick, Gouania hillebrandii, of Hawaii

See also
 Toothbrush
 Oral hygiene